Mike Flynn is an American government official who served as the Acting Deputy Administrator of the United States Environmental Protection Agency from 2017-2018.

Career 
Flynn joined the Environmental Protection agency in 1980 and served in a variety of positions including as  the agency's Associate Deputy Administrator before being appointed deputy administrator. Flynn announced that he would retire in 2018.  Andrew Wheeler was confirmed as Deputy Administrator of the EPA on April 12, 2018, replacing Flynn.

References

Living people
Year of birth missing (living people)
Trump administration personnel